Michaela Johansson (born 6 March 1988) is a former professional tennis player from Sweden.

Biography
A right-handed player from Stockholm, Johansson was a top-50 ranked junior. She debuted for the Sweden Fed Cup team as a 16-year old in 2004, featuring in a doubles rubber against Serbia and Montenegro. 

As a wildcard at the 2007 Nordic Light Open, held in her home city, she made her first WTA Tour main draw, beaten in three sets by Klára Zakopalová in the opening round.

Across 2007 and 2008 she appeared in two further Fed Cup ties for Sweden, against Estonia and Belarus respectively.

Johansson competed in the main draw at the 2009 Swedish Open in Bastad, where she made it through from the qualifying draw.

ITF finals

Singles: 2(1–1)

Doubles: 6 (2-4)

See also
List of Sweden Fed Cup team representatives

References

External links
 
 
 

1988 births
Living people
Swedish female tennis players
Tennis players from Stockholm
20th-century Swedish women
21st-century Swedish women